EN 301 549 is a European standard for digital accessibility. It specifies requirements for information and communications technology to be accessible for people with disabilities.

EN 301 549 was developed by CEN, CENELEC and ETSI to set requirements for public procurement of products and services in the European Union. It has since been superseded by subsequent releases:
 EN 301 549 V1.1.2 (2015-04)
 EN 301 549 V2.1.2 (2018-08)
 EN 301 549 V3.1.1 (2019-11)
 EN 301 549 V3.2.1 (2021-03)

In version 2.1.2 the Harmonized Accessibility Standards officially adopted the W3C's WCAG 2.1 guidelines. Previous versions of EN 301 549 embraced WCAG 2.0 as an ‘electronic attachment’, but version 2.1.2 directly referenced WCAG 2.1 AA.

The EU approved the Web Accessibility Directive before this harmonized standard had been developed. The implemented decision provides for the presumption of conformity between member states. Member states had until September 2018 to create the laws and regulations which enforce the relevant accessibility requirements. Members states are free to determine how they achieve the standards of EN 301 549 and may exceed them. However, they now constitute a minimum standard for the EU.

The standard includes web and mobile applications but also addresses a wide range of other technologies beside those covered by WCAG:
 Information and communications technology (ICT) products; 
 Services related to products; 
 Web sites; and 
 Some specific telecommunications services necessary to provide alternative modes of communication for speech modality (such as text or images) and their routing could offer access to services such as emergency calls or relay services for everyone.

European public entities are expected to meet the following deadlines:
 Requirements are already in force for any website published since September 23, 2019.
 Public websites (including existing sites) are required to comply by September 23, 2020.
 Mobile apps in the public sector are required to comply by June 23, 2021.

The EN 301 549 standards are being applied outside the European Union as countries like Australia are adopting it to improve accessibility for their citizens and ease trade with the EU. This is an example of the Brussels effect.

See also

Section 508 Amendment to the Rehabilitation Act of 1973

References

External links
 Accessible ICT Procurement Toolkit
 Deque: EU Web Accessibility Compliance and Legislation
 EN 301 549: Essential Accessibility: The European Standard for Digital Accessibility
 EU Directive on the Accessibility of Public Sector Websites and Mobile Applications
 EU Web Accessibility Laws: EN 301 549 and EAA
 EN 301 549 V3 the harmonized European Standard for ICT Accessibility

EN standards
Accessibility
Accessible Procurement
Disability legislation
Disability in law